Chetyrbash (Sıtırbaş) is a rural locality (a village) in Miyakinsky Selsoviet, Miyakinsky District, Bashkortostan, Russia. The population was 117 as of 2010. There are 2 streets.

Geography 
Chetyrbash is located 7 km southwest of Kirgiz-Miyaki (the district's administrative centre) by road. Kirgiz-Miyaki is the nearest rural locality.

References 

Rural localities in Miyakinsky District